The Cathedral of Saint Paul — informally known as Saint Paul's Cathedral — is the mother church of the Roman Catholic Diocese of Worcester.  It is located at 38 Chatham Street in downtown Worcester, Massachusetts.  Built between 1868 and 1889, it is one of the city's finest examples of Victorian Gothic architecture, and was listed on the National Register of Historic Places in 1980.

Architecture
The Cathedral of Saint Paul stands in downtown Worcester, facing north on the south side of Chatham Street at High Street, one block west of Main Street.  It is a large stone cruciform structure, built out rock-faced granite blocks.  The main facade consists of a tall square tower on the right, the gabled end of the nave at the center, and a smaller square tower topped by a round turret on the left.  There are entrances in the base of the large tower, and in projecting Gothic-arched sections in front of the nave.  The main roof is steeply pitched, with a cross at the front gable end, and tall Gothic windows in the gables at the nave and transepts.

History
The parish of Saint Paul was founded in 1866 by John Power, the rector of Saint Anne's Parish. The church was designed by architects E. Boyden & Son, and construction began in the spring of 1868. The first services were held in the basement in 1869. The superstructure, excluding the main tower, was completed by 1874, at which time the church was dedicated. When the Roman Catholic Diocese of Worcester was established, it was elevated to the cathedral church by Bishop John J. Wright on March 7, 1950.

A statue of St. Francis of Assisi occupies the small courtyard on the side of the church.  During the Christmas season, the church also displays its Nativity here.

Gallery

See also

List of Catholic cathedrals in the United States
List of cathedrals in the United States
 National Register of Historic Places listings in northwestern Worcester, Massachusetts
 National Register of Historic Places listings in Worcester County, Massachusetts

References

External links

Official Cathedral Site
Roman Catholic Diocese of Worcester Official Site 
Places of the Past, St. Paul's Cathedral

Churches on the National Register of Historic Places in Massachusetts
Roman Catholic churches in Worcester, Massachusetts
Paul Worcester
Stone churches in Massachusetts
Religious organizations established in 1869
Roman Catholic churches completed in 1874
Gothic Revival church buildings in Massachusetts
National Register of Historic Places in Worcester, Massachusetts
1869 establishments in Massachusetts
19th-century Roman Catholic church buildings in the United States